The First National Bank of Hood River is a historic bank building located in downtown Hood River, Oregon, United States. The bank building was listed on the National Register of Historic Places in 2006.

See also

National Register of Historic Places listings in Hood River County, Oregon

References

External links

1910 establishments in Oregon
Commercial buildings completed in 1910
Buildings and structures in Hood River, Oregon
National Register of Historic Places in Hood River County, Oregon
Neoclassical architecture in Oregon